Monument Peak may refer to:

 Monument Peak (Riverside County), California in the Temescal Mountains
 Monument Peak (San Bernardino County), California in the San Bernardino Mountains
 Monument Peak (Mendocino County), California 
 Monument Peak (Milpitas, California)
 Monument Peak (Idaho)
 Monument Peak in Beaverhead County, Montana
 Monument Peak in Sweet Grass County, Montana
 Monument Peak in Washoe County, Montana
 Monument Peak (Nevada)
 Monument Peak (Utah)
 Monument Peak (Washington)
 Brian Head, Utah, a town previously named Monument Peak
 Brian Head (mountain), a peak previously named Monument Peak

See also
 Monument Mountain